is a 2002 Japanese animated science fiction thriller film directed by Fumihiko Takayama and Takuji Endo. The third and final installment of the Patlabor film trilogy, it takes place in between Patlabor: The Movie and Patlabor 2: The Movie and serves as a side story. Written by Miki Tori, it follows two police detectives and SV2 as they investigate a series of mysterious acts of deadly destruction occurring in and around Tokyo Bay that may be connected to a genetic experiment gone wrong. It was animated by Madhouse and produced by Bandai Visual and Tohokushinsha.

Plot

In 2000, a series of unknown attacks on Labors have led to two police detectives, Shinichiro Hata and Takeshi Kusumi, being assigned to investigate these string of events, assisted by members of the Tokyo Metropolitan Police Department's SV2 unit.

As they begin to unravel the mystery behind the attacks, the two detectives find reason to suspect that the attacks may have something to do with the American military stationed in Japan, elements of the Japanese Ground Self-Defense Forces, and a female scientist involved in a biological weapons program known as Wasted XIII.

Cast

Development
Very similar in premise and plot to episode 3 of the original OVA The 450-Million-Year-Old Trap and the manga arcs in volumes 7 to 10 that greatly extended the plot of that episode.

Release
WXIII premiered out of competition during the Tokyo International Fantastic Film Festival, which had special screening on December 10, 2001. WXIII'''s Japanese theatrical release took place on March 30, 2002 to coincide with the release of Minipato. Geneon Entertainment licensed WXIII for its North American theatrical release on January 10, 2003 and DVD release on May 2003, which was eventually followed by later DVD releases to Europe and Oceania. It was licensed in Australia by Madman Entertainment. Section23 Films has licensed all three Patlabor films for North America. Section23 Films released the movie on Blu-ray and DVD on September 8, 2015.

ReceptionWXIII garnered generally mixed reviews, and holds an average of 47/100 on aggregate web site Metacritic.

Animerica gave it a favorable review calling it an "ambitious work which holds its own with both Oshii's justly acclaimed Patlabor'' movies and with the best works of Japan's live-action horror cinema."

References

External links
 WXIII * PATLABOR THE MOVIE 3 
 
 

2002 anime films
2000s science fiction thriller films
Animated thriller films
Bandai Visual
Film spin-offs
Films set in 2000
Films set in Tokyo
Geneon USA
Interquel films
Japanese animated science fiction films
Japanese thriller films
2000s Japanese-language films
Madhouse (company)
Maiden Japan
Patlabor
Postcyberpunk films
Films scored by Kenji Kawai
Films directed by Fumihiko Takayama